Liliana Barba Meinecke (born January 16, 1973) is a Mexican voice actress and voice director. She usually voices tomboyish young women.

Filmography
 Alex Dunphy (voiceover for Ariel Winter) in Modern Family (Current voice)
 Mikaela Banes (voiceover for Megan Fox) in Transformers (2007) and Transformers: Revenge of the Fallen (2009)
 Mary Jane Watson (voiceover for Kirsten Dunst) in Spider-Man 3 (2007)
 Wendy Christensen (voiceover for Mary Elizabeth Winstead) in Final Destination 3 (2006)
 Ensign Tashigi in One Piece (2006)
 Frankie Foster in Foster's Home for Imaginary Friends
 Elizabeth en Blood+
 Anzu Mazaki in Yu-Gi-Oh! The Movie: Pyramid of Light (2004)
 Rukia Kuchiki in Bleach (2004)
 Lizzie McGuire (voiceover for Hilary Duff) in Lizzie McGuire: Estrella de Hollywood (2003)
 Sango in InuYasha (2002–2006)
 Sanae Nakazawa in Captain Tsubasa: Road to 2002 (2002)
 Hitomi Chidou in Great Dangaioh (2001)
 Lizzie McGuire (voiceover for Hilary Duff) in Lizzie McGuire (2001–2004)
 Anzu Mazaki in Yu-Gi-Oh! Duel Monsters (her first well-known role)
 Daisy Duck (current voice)
 Chuckie Finster in Rugrats (second voice) and All Grown Up!
 Mary Katherine Gallagher (voiceover for Molly Shannon) in Superestrella (1999)
 Yuzuha in La Hija del Oscuro (1997) (her feature film debut)
 Emi the TV in Dotto Koni-chan (1999–2001)
 La Enfermera Joy (Nurse Joy) in Pokémon (1998) (first voice)
 Claire Redfield en Resident Evil "Degeneration"
 Viper in Kung Fu Panda
 Gizmoduck (Trailers Voice In DuckTales Remastered)
 Regina George in Mean Girls (2004)

Video games
 Riven in League of Legends

References

Living people
Mexican voice actresses
21st-century Mexican actresses
20th-century Mexican actresses
Actresses from Mexico City
Mexican actresses
Mexican voice directors
1973 births